It's Magic, Charlie Brown is the 21st prime-time animated television special based upon the comic strip Peanuts, by Charles M. Schulz. It originally aired on April 28, 1981.

Plot
Charlie Brown decides that Snoopy needs to educate himself, and gives him his library card to check out a few books. Snoopy takes out a book about magic and performs a magic show as "The Great Houndini." He ends the show by making Charlie Brown disappear. A sudden rainstorm ends the show early, and Charlie Brown is left invisible. Snoopy tries several ideas to make him visible again, including draping a sheet over him, which only scares Charlie Brown when he looks in the mirror and sees what he thinks is a ghost.

Charlie Brown realizes he has a golden opportunity to kick Lucy's football without her knowing. Charlie Brown finally succeeds in kicking the football and taunts her about it. Furious, Lucy threatens Snoopy into bringing back Charlie Brown.

Charlie Brown is happy that he finally kicked the football, although Lucy says no one will believe him. Charlie Brown says that Snoopy will believe him. When Lucy scoffs at Snoopy, the insulted beagle magically levitates Lucy into the sky, and leaves her stuck there as payback.

Cast 
 Michael Mandy as Charlie Brown
Peter Robbins as Charlie Brown screaming (archived)
 Sydney Penny as Lucy van Pelt
 Cindi Reilly as Sally Brown
 Earl Reilly as Linus van Pelt, Franklin
 Brent Hauer as Peppermint Patty
 Shannon Cohn/Casey Carlson as Marcie
 Christopher Donohone as Schroeder
 Bill Melendez as Snoopy, Woodstock

Home media
It's Magic, Charlie Brown was released on DVD on September 2, 2008 as a bonus feature on Warner Home Video's remaster of It's the Great Pumpkin, Charlie Brown.

References

External links 
 

Peanuts television specials
Television shows directed by Phil Roman
1980s American television specials
1980s animated television specials
1981 television specials
1981 in American television
CBS television specials
Films about invisibility
Films about magic and magicians